Walter Currie (1922-2014) was an educator and public advocate. He was part of the movement after the Second World War advocating for Indigenous educational reform at the local and national level in Canada.

History
Walter Currie was born in Chatham, Ontario in 1922. The son of William and Clara Currie, he was a non-status Indian of Potowatomi and Ojibwe descent. He served three years in the Royal Canadian Air Force during World War Two, and later studied engineering at the University of Toronto, before leaving his studies early to support his young family.  He would later complete his degree at the University of Windsor and go on to complete his teacher's certificate at London's Teachers College. He was a school teacher in Kitchener and principal at Danesbury Public School in North York Township between 1953 and 1968. In 1966 he was appointed to head an Ontario Governmental committee on the "Indian in the City." He later became a superintendent with the Ontario Department of Education with responsibilities Indian and northern schools from 1968 to 1971.  During this period, he was active in local and provincial affairs, and s quoted in major newspapers on topics related to Indigenous education, discrimination against Indigenous people in urban areas, lack of representation of Indigenous history, language and culture in the media and in school curriculum, as well as the "social ills" of television.

Currie also served as president of the Indian-Eskimo Association of Canada and was the first chairman of the Toronto Indian Friendship Centre from 1969-1971. He was one of the first two members of Ontario's Human Rights Commission, and served from 1972 to 1974. In July 1971, Currie was appointed as chair of Native Studies at Trent University, where he served a term to 1975. In this role, Currie continued to be active on provincial and national Indigenous issues, particularly educational reform, repatriation of cultural artifacts, and, entrepreneurial opportunities on- and off-reserve for Indigenous business people. He also co-wrote a commissioned report with Donald L. Faris in 1983, in which they investigated claims that the City of Regina's police force was misusing police dogs. Currie died on January 11, 2014.

Select publications and speeches

References

External links 
 Walter Currie entry in the Canadian Encyclopedia
 Portrait of Walter Currie, Toronto Star Photographic Archives, 1972
 Scanned copy of Indians in the City available through the Internet Archive, via Trent University Library

1922 births
2014 deaths
Activists from Ontario
First Nations activists
Academic staff of Trent University
University of Windsor alumni
People from Chatham-Kent
People from Kitchener, Ontario
First Nations academics
Non-Status Indians